Nettleton School District (or Nettleton Public Schools) is a public school district based in Jonesboro, Arkansas, United States. The school district provides early childhood, elementary and secondary education for more than 3,200 kindergarten through grade 12 students at its seven facilities at Jonesboro in Craighead County.

Nettleton School District is accredited by the Arkansas Department of Education (ADE) and has been accredited by AdvancED since 2007.

Schools

Secondary schools 
 Nettleton High School—serving more than 850 students in grades 9 through 12.
 Nettleton Junior High School—serving more than 450 students in grades 7 through 8.

Elementary schools 
 Fox Meadow Elementary School—serving approximately 400 students in kindergarten through grade 2.
 Fox Meadow Intermediate Center—serving approximately 350 students in grades 3 through 5.
 University Heights Intermediate Center—serving approximately 400 students in grades 3 through 5.
 Nettleton STEAM —serving approximately 500 students in grade 3-6.
 University Heights Elementary School—serving approximately 350 students in kindergarten through grade 2.

References

External links 

 

School districts in Arkansas
Education in Craighead County, Arkansas
Education in Mississippi County, Arkansas
Jonesboro, Arkansas